Cecil Hills High School (abbreviated as CHHS) is a government-funded co-educational comprehensive secondary day school, located at 50 Spencer Road, Cecil Hills, a south-western suburb of Sydney, New South Wales, Australia.

Established in 1996, the school currently caters for approximately 1,450 students from Year 7 to Year 12, including 85% of students who are from a non-English speaking background. The school has an integrated support unit catering for students with moderate and severe intellectual and/or physical disability, including autism. The school is operated by the New South Wales Department of Education and the principal is Mark Sutton.

History 
Cecil Hills High School was established in 1996. The school has had three principals since its opening, including John McGregor (1996-2004), Sean Bowen (2004-2015) and Mark Sutton (2015-present). In the first year of operation, the school had only Year 7 students, totalling 121. Since then, the school’s population grew substantially, as more cohorts entered the school. The first Year 12 cohort graduated in 2001. There are additionally three teachers in the school that have been teaching since the school opened. The school celebrated its 20th anniversary in December 2016.

Facilities

Sporting 

Cecil Hills High School has a large gymnasium, which contains one full-sized basketball court, and is used for basketball, indoor soccer, slider hockey, dodgeball, as well as school assemblies. There are additionally 2 outdoor basketball courts, 2 volleyball courts, 2 netball courts and a softball diamond.

Extra-curricular activities 

Cecil Hills High School offers a range of activities outside of the classroom, including debating, public speaking, clubs and House challenges. The school has a Junior and Senior debating team, that regularly compete with local schools, and in 2014, the Year 9 debating team advanced to the regionals, versing a new selection of schools. The school additionally has clubs to unite students with similar interests, including the chess club. Cecil Hills offers a St. John Cadets program, where students can learn skills in leadership, as well as first aid.

Sport 

Cecil Hills High School has an outstanding reputation regarding sport, in both the local area, and on a regional level. The school holds annual swimming and athletics carnivals, where students participate in a range of sports to advance to zone, where they compete against other schools. In addition to these carnivals, the school offers a range of sporting competitions and knockout tournaments for all ages, including basketball, futsal, soccer and tennis.

House system 

Cecil Hills High School has four houses in which students are distributed based on their surname. Students can earn points for their house through 3 fields: academic, sporting and extracurricular. Each year, 2 year 11 students and 2 year 10 students are nominated as captain and vice-captain of their house, respectively, providing yet another leadership opportunity for students. The house spirit also encourages friendly competition and further participation at swimming and athletics carnivals. The four houses are all named after significant Australian peoples.

20th anniversary celebration
In 2016, Cecil Hills High School celebrated its 20th anniversary. The celebratory week in December involved an aerial photograph that included every staff member and every student. A teachers versus former students soccer match was held, and a time capsule was unveiled for display in the front office. A formal assembly was held, honouring the work of the two previous principals, John McGregor and Sean Bowen. The Performance Space was renamed The McGregor Centre in honour of the school's founding principal. 
One of the highlights of the celebration was the spring fair, celebrating the anniversary. This was an overwhelming event where approximately five thousand community members came for a Friday night of fun with musical performances, food stalls, rides, a petting zoo, market stalls, exhibitions and a fireworks display. A gala dinner was additionally held, which doubled as a reunion for many past students, parents and teachers.

25th anniversary celebration
In 2021, Cecil Hills High School celebrates its silver jubilee or quadranscentennial anniversary.

Western Sydney International Airport
The suburb of Badgerys Creek is the location of the proposed Western Sydney International Airport and it within the enrolment area for Cecil Hills High School.  The feeder primary school of Badgerys Creek Public School closed in 2014 to allow the development of the new airport.  A new suburb of Bradfield is expected to be built in and around the airport site and will provide training links for students at Cecil Hills High School.

See also

 List of government schools in New South Wales
 Education in Australia

References

External links 
 

Public high schools in Sydney
School buildings completed in 1996
1996 establishments in Australia
Educational institutions established in 1996